Shir Dar Kola (also Romanized as Shīr Dār Kolā) is a village in Babol Kenar Rural District, Babol Kenar District, Babol County, Mazandaran Province, Iran. At the 2006 census, its population was 1,338, in 384 families.

References 

Populated places in Babol County